(born July 16, 1943) is a prominent organic chemist and currently a member of the faculty at the University of Chicago and professor of Chubu University.

Life
Born in Kobe, Japan, Yamamoto earned a B.S. at Kyoto University in 1967 and a Ph.D. at Harvard University in 1971. 

He was a professor at Nagoya University from 1983 until 2002 and has since been a professor within the Department of Chemistry at the University of Chicago. His research work is largely in the chemistry of acid catalysts that play an important role in triggering or driving chemical reactions, specifically Lewis and Brønsted acid catalysts used in selective organic synthesis. Yamamoto has authored or co-authored several books on topics in modern synthetic organic chemistry. As of 2021, his h-index equals to 120 with more than 64,000 citations.

Awards and recognitions
1988 Japan IBM Science Prize
1992 Chu-Nichi Culture Prize
2002 Medals with Purple ribbon
2003 Fellow of the American Association for the Advancement of Science (AAAS)
2004 Yamada-Koga Prize
2006 Tetrahedron Prize for Creativity in Organic Chemistry & BioMedicinal Chemistry
2007 Japan Academy Prize (academics)
2007 Humboldt Prize
2011 The Ryoji Noyori Prize
2012 Fujihara Award
2017 The Roger Adams Award (American Chemical Society)
2018 Person of Cultural Merit

References

External links

External links
University of Chicago Department of Chemistry profile
University of Chicago Experts Guide

1943 births
Living people
Organic chemists
Harvard University alumni
Kyoto University alumni
Academic staff of Nagoya University
University of Chicago faculty
Humboldt Research Award recipients
Recipients of the Medal of Honor (Japan)
Fellows of the American Association for the Advancement of Science
Persons of Cultural Merit
People from Kobe
Toray Industries people